Gustloff is a German surname. Notable people with the surname include:

Wilhelm Gustloff, the German leader of the Swiss Nazi party

See also
MV Wilhelm Gustloff, a German military transport ship which was sunk on 30 January 1945.
Gustloff Werke, manufacturing facilities such as the subsidiary Otto Eberhardt Patronenfabrik

German-language surnames